The 1997 Formula Shell Super Unleaded season was the 13th season of the franchise in the Philippine Basketball Association (PBA).

Draft picks

Notable dates
March 7: After being held down to only 56 points in a loss to San Miguel Beermen in their previous game a week before, the Shell Zoom Masters scored their second win in five games in the All-Filipino Cup by beating Alaska Milkmen, 78-70.   

June 13: Former San Miguel import John Best in his second stint in the PBA as Shell hired his services instead of last year's Commissioners Cup best import Kenny Redfield, who moved to Sta.Lucia, scored 41 points as the Zoom Masters defeated an off-form Purefoods Corned Beef Cowboys, 114-106, at the start of the Commissioners Cup. 

July 20: Formula Shell earned a semifinal ticket in the Commissioners Cup with a 100-97 victory over Alaska Milkmen. Import John Best led five Shell double figure scorers with 36 points. 

October 14: Import Dennis Williams scored 35 points as Shell finally break into win column in the Governors Cup after six losses with a 101-96 victory over Pop Cola. The Zoom Masters have lost eight straight since the Commissioners Cup semifinals.

Occurrences
Seven-time best import Bobby Parks played in his 11th season in the PBA but was injured after seeing action for three games in the Governor's Cup, Parks was replaced by Dennis Williams.

Roster

Transactions

Additions

Recruited imports

References

Formula
Shell Turbo Chargers seasons

tl:Panahong PBA 1997